James Henry Jones (died April 8, 1921) was a personal servant, coachman, contractor, deputy sheriff, firefighter, and courier. He worked for Jefferson Davis and served as an alderman in Raleigh, North Carolina. He was a Republican.

He was a delegate to the 1865 Colored Men's Convention held in Raleigh and served in the Union League. He married and had two sons.

References

North Carolina politicians
Year of birth missing
1921 deaths